Abermain is a town 8 km ENE of Cessnock and 3 km west of Weston, in New South Wales, Australia. Abermain is adjacent to Werakata National Park.

Abermain Post Office opened on 1 June 1904. In 1882 Professor Sir Tannatt William Edgeworth David was appointed by NSW Department of Mines to undertake a survey to discover the possibility of coal. Australian's second Mine Rescue Station was constructed in 1926 and at cost of £20,000.

Schools and education
Abermain is home to Holy Spirit Infants School and Aspect Hunter School, both non-government schools, and Abermain Public School, founded in 1909.

Notable people 
Les Lumsdon (1912–1977) cartoonist for Newcastle Morning Herald

References

Suburbs of City of Cessnock
Towns in the Hunter Region